Glenn Delaney (born 16 November 1973) is a New Zealand professional rugby union football coach. He was recently the head coach of the Pro14 side Scarlets. Delaney also had a professional rugby career, playing rugby in Japan and for London Irish and Narbonne.

References

Living people
New Zealand rugby union coaches
Scarlets coaches
1973 births
People from Timaru
Rugby union locks
Rugby union number eights